The secretary of the Commonwealth of Pennsylvania (or "secretary of state") administers the Pennsylvania Department of State of the U.S. state (officially, "commonwealth") of Pennsylvania. The secretary is appointed by the governor subject to confirmation by the state senate.

Background 
The department protects the public's health, safety, and welfare by licensing more than one million business, health, and real estate professionals; maintaining registration and financial information for thousands of charities soliciting contributions from Pennsylvanians; overseeing Pennsylvania's electoral process; maintaining corporate filings; and sanctioning professional boxing, kick–boxing and wrestling in the commonwealth. Unlike many other states which elect the secretary of state, in Pennsylvania, this position is appointed by the governor with the advice and consent of the Pennsylvania Senate.

The secretary is the keeper of the Great Seal of the Commonwealth and authenticates government documents through the seal's use. The secretary is also the commonwealth's chief election official.

Boards and commissions 
 Chairman of the Pennsylvania Election Reform Task Force
 Chairman of the Navigation Commission for the Delaware River and Its Navigable Tributaries
 The Board of Finance and Revenue
 The Board of Property
 The Pennsylvania Municipal Retirement Board
 The State Athletic Commission
 The Interbranch Commission for Gender, Racial and Ethnic Fairness
 The Lobbying Disclosure Regulations Committee

Secretaries of the Commonwealth of Pennsylvania

Structure of the Department of State 
The Pennsylvania Department of State consists of six bureaus: 
 Bureau of Corporations and Charitable Organizations
 Bureau of Finance and Operations
 Bureau of Enforcement and Investigation
 Bureau of Professional and Occupational Affairs
 Bureau of Commissions, Elections, and Legislation
 State Athletic Commission

See also 
 Secretary of State (U.S. state government)
 Attorney General of Pennsylvania

References

External links 
 Pennsylvania Department of State Homepage
Pennsylvania: Secretaries of the Commonwealth
Pennsylvania Secretary of State, Ballotpedia: The Encyclopedia of American Politics